Crozier is a surname. Clan Crozier is a clan from the border area between England and Scotland.

Notable people with the surname include:

Adam Crozier (born 1964), Scottish businessman
Andrew Crozier (1943-2008), British poet
Brett Crozier (born 1970), American naval officer and naval aviator
Brian Crozier (1918-2012), British historian, strategist, and journalist
Brian Crozier, American guitarist
Bruce Crozier (1938-2011), Canadian politician
Cecily Crozier (1911–2006), Australian artist, poet and literary editor
Daniel Crozier, American composer and academic
Douglas James Smyth Crozier (1908-1976), a British educator and later Secretary for Education in Hong Kong post-war
Eric Crozier (1914–1994), British theatrical director and opera librettist
Eric Crozier (baseball) (born 1978), American professional baseball player
Fitzroy Crozier (born 1936), Ceylon cricketer
Francis Crozier (1796–1848), Irish polar explorer
Frank Percy Crozier (1879–1937), British Army general
Frank R. Crozier (1883-1948), Australian war artist of the First World War
Greg Crozier (born 1976), Canadian ice hockey player
Hayden Crozier (born 1993), Australian footballer
Joe Crozier (born 1929), Canadian ice hockey coach
John Baptist Crozier (1858–1920), Church of Ireland Archbishop of Armagh
John Crozier (politician) (1814–1887) was a pastoralist and politician in South Australia
John Derek Crozier, better known as Crosaire (1917–2010), Irish cryptic crossword compiler
John Hervey Crozier (1812–1889), American politician
Leif Newry Fitzroy Crozier (1846–1901), Canadian militia officer and a superintendent of the North-West Mounted Police
Lorna Crozier (born 1948), Canadian poet
Michel Crozier (1922–2013), French sociologist
Robert Crozier (1827–1895), American politician
Robert Crozier (artist) (1815–1891), English painter
Roger Crozier (1942–1996), Canadian ice hockey goaltender
William Crozier (disambiguation), any of several people

References

French-language surnames